Stephen Stanley Attwood (1897–1965) was an American academic. He was a professor at the Wave Propagation Group, division of War Research, Columbia University.

External links
 Stephen S. Attwood Excellence in Engineering Award

1897 births
1965 deaths
Columbia University faculty